Maysk (Şoorno) is a rural locality (a selo) in Mayskoye Rural Settlement of Turochaksky District, the Altai Republic, Russia. The population was 118 as of 2016. There are 3 streets.

Geography 
Maysk is located at the confluence of the Kaurchak and Lebed Rivers, 159 km east of Turochak (the district's administrative centre) by road. Kirpichny is the nearest rural locality.

References 

Rural localities in Turochaksky District